WLAU (99.3 FM, "SuperTalk Mississippi 99.3") is an American radio station licensed to serve the community of Heidelberg, Mississippi. The station is licensed to and owned by TeleSouth Communications, Inc.

Licensed as "WEEZ" since 1979, the station's call sign was changed to "WHER" by the Federal Communications Commission (FCC) on March 13, 1999. The station's call sign was changed again to "WLAU" by the FCC on June 26, 2012.

, WLAU broadcasts a News/Talk format to the greater Laurel/Hattiesburg, Mississippi, area as part of the SuperTalk Mississippi Network. While the station was owned by Clear Channel Communications, it aired a country music format branded as "Eagle 99".

References

External links
WLAU official website

LAU
News and talk radio stations in the United States
Jasper County, Mississippi